William Nicholson may refer to:

William Nicholson (English bishop) (1591–1672), Bishop of Gloucester
William Nicholson (chemist) (1753–1815), English chemist, publisher, and inventor
William Nicholson (artist, born 1781) (1781–1844), English portrait-painter and etcher
William Nicholson (poet) (1782–1849), Scottish poet, known as the Bard of Galloway
William Nicholson (U.S. Navy officer) (c. 1790–1872), U.S. Navy officer
William Adams Nicholson (1803–1853), English architect
William Newzam Nicholson (1816–1899), British Member of Parliament for Newark, 1880–1885
William Nicholson (Australian politician) (1816–1865), Mayor of Melbourne and Premier of Victoria
William Nicholson (American bishop) (1822–1901), American bishop of the Reformed Episcopal Church
William Nicholson (distiller) (1824–1909), British distiller, politician, cricketer and cricket benefactor
William Nicholson, 1st Baron Nicholson (1845–1918), British field marshal and Chief of the Imperial General Staff
William Jones Nicholson (1856–1931), U.S. Army general
William Graham Nicholson (1862–1942), British Liberal Unionist and later Conservative Party politician
Sir William Nicholson (Royal Navy officer) (1863–1932), British admiral
William H. Nicholson (1869–1911), first African American fireman in the New York City Fire Department
Sir William Nicholson (artist) (1872–1949), English painter and engraver
William Nicholson (journalist) (1877–1957), New Zealand clerk, local politician, builder, journalist and editor
Willie Nicholson (fl. 1924–1936), Scottish footballer
William L. Nicholson (1926–2020), U.S. Air Force general
William Nicholson (sound engineer) (born 1937), American film sound engineer
William Nicholson (writer) (born 1948), British screenwriter, playwright and novelist

See also
Bill Nicholson (disambiguation)
Billy Nicholson (disambiguation)
William Nicolson (1655–1727), English divine and antiquary